Bob Boykin is an American musician, session musician, composer, and producer, best known as a guitarist.

Career 
Bob grew up on a farm outside of Savannah, on a dirt road in south Georgia. He began playing music professionally by age 16 in the local clubs in Savannah. Soon after high school he moved to Nashville, where he started working as a studio guitarist and songwriter, working with many of Nashville's top stars in the studio and on the Grand Ole Opry.

He first came to Los Angeles in the mid 80s for a recording session for his first solo CD with many of LA's top studio musicians.  A few years later, he returned to LA. It wasn't long before he played on his first television show as a side man, for Marvel Comics Saturday morning cartoon shows and the hit TV series MacGyver. It was during that time he teamed up with Grammy winning Saxophonist Ernie Watts, and produced many collaborative original works, including the Billboard Top Ten song "Language of the Heart" which appears on the Ernie Watts Quartet album. Soon after that he began composing songs and main titles for Columbia Pictures, Sony, Glen Larson at 20th Century Fox, Warner Brothers and MGM. His original songs and scores have been heard on hit shows such as Sex and the City, West Wing, The X-Files, Chris Isaak Show, Married People, Fame, Route 66, Married... with Children, Sea Hunt, L. A. Firefighters and Moon Over Miami (with members of the "Tonight Show Band") and feature films like Toy Story, Chicken Run, Red Surf, Keys To Tulsa, Sister Sister, Flypaper, AFI, Women in Film- Steven Spielberg, Down The Barrel, and Take The Lead (starring Antonio Banderas) to name a few. Bob was later hired as the weekly composer and music producer of the #1 ABC weekly prime-time series Married People including composing the main & end titles, produced by Columbia Pictures/Sony.

He has composed for dozens of film and television shows including themes and soundtracks to his recording credit.

His solo CD, Hazardous Material was released in 1997 and featured players from across the music spectrum including Ernie Watts, Abraham Laboriel, Brian Bromberg, Jimmy Earl, Neil Stubenhaus, Jerry Hey, Gary Grant, Bill Rechienbach, Paul Leim, Dave Carpenter, Greg Mathieson, James Zavala, Jimmy Z, Dann Huff, Luis Conte, Joel Taylor, Pat Coil, and others.

A Guitar World magazine review stated "Four Stars – Ain't Too Proud to Shred'' – Firepower is the key word in this jazz/rock workout. Boykin is a ferocious soloist who segues from bop-style jazz phrases to wailing rock licks with the greatest of ease.”

Vintage Guitar magazine says....."From '70s-style funk, to blues, to killer ballad work and pretty much any jazz style you can think of, Boykin's playing shines."

Guitar International magazine names him "… a "go to" session player in Los Angeles and Nashville, with an impressive body of music that regularly finds its way into top television programs and commercials as well as major motion pictures."

Filmography

References

External links
 

American session musicians
American rock guitarists
American country guitarists
American male guitarists
Record producers from California
Musicians from San Diego
Guitarists from California
Country musicians from California
1952 births